Shopping City Timișoara is a shopping mall located in Timișoara, Romania. At the time of its completion, it was the second shopping mall in Timișoara. In the first year since its opening in 2016, Shopping City Timișoara had a traffic of over nine million visitors.

Facilities 
The mall is built on an 18-hectare plot of land and has a leasable area of 70,000 m2. The two-story construction has 110 shops, 2,700 on-site and above-ground parking spaces with electric/hybrid car charging stations, a self-service car wash and bicycle racks. It has a 13-screen Cinema City multiplex with IMAX and 4DX halls which is the first and only cinema in Romania with these technologies in one cinema. With a total capacity of 2,400 seats and an area of 4,000 m2, it is the largest multiplex outside Bucharest. 10,000 m2 of its leasable area are occupied by a Carrefour hypermarket, and 16,000 m2 by a Dedeman DIY store. The mall also includes a food court, a fitness center with a semi-Olympic swimming pool, a casino, a seasonal ice rink, terraces and a 350-square-meter children's playground.

References

External links 

 Official website

Shopping malls in Timișoara